Glenwild is an unincorporated community located in Grenada County, Mississippi and part of the Grenada Micropolitan Statistical Area.

The community is named for the former Glenwild Plantation. The plantation was originally built in 1839 by Colonel A. W. Payne. It was eventually purchased  in 1921 by Lieutenant Commander John Borden (who commanded the USS Kanawha and was awarded the Navy Cross during World War I). Borden had an electric generating plant, a water tower, and a railroad depot built at the plantation. The Panama Limited made regular stops at Glenwild and private Pullman cars brought Borden's guests to the plantation. 

Glenwild is located on the former Illinois Central Railroad.

References

Unincorporated communities in Grenada County, Mississippi
Unincorporated communities in Mississippi